St Andrew's Church, Newcastle upon Tyne is a Grade I listed parish church in the Church of England in Newcastle upon Tyne, Tyne and Wear, England.

History

The church dates from the 12th century, but is mainly of 13th and 14th century construction. The porch was re-fronted in 1726. Other restoration work was undertaken in 1866 by Fowler. 

A large section of the medieval Newcastle town wall still survives immediately to the north of the church, and the imposing New Gate in the city wall stood close by to the east until its demolition in 1823. Newgate Street to which it gave its name still runs past the east end of the church.

Burials

The Newcastle-born portrait painter William Bell was buried at the church in June 1794.
The Newcastle-born composer Charles Avison was buried by the north porch in 1795.

Organ

The earliest records of organs are from 1783 when an organ was installed by Donaldson. Subsequent restorations have been carried out by Gray, Nicholson, Binns and Harrison and Harrison.

A specification of the organ can be found on the National Pipe Organ Register.

Organists
Thomas Hawdon 1783
George Barron 1783 - 1787
George Carr 1787 - 1790
Thomas Wright 1790 - 1796 
Henry Munro (or Monro) 1796 - 1819
James Stimpson 1836  - 1841
Samuel Reay 1841 - 1845
J.S. Liddle ca. 1852
Mr. Wish 1864 - ????
Thomas Albion Alderson 1867 - 1902
Harold Oswald ca. 1916

Bells
In the tower hangs six bells all cast by Mears and Stainbank in 1966. The largest weighs 16.5 cwt or 844kg.

References

Church of England church buildings in Tyne and Wear
Grade I listed churches in Tyne and Wear
12th-century church buildings in England